The Bouclier class consisted of twelve destroyers built between 1910 and 1912 for the French Navy, four of which were lost during the First World War.

Design and description
The Bouclier-class was nearly double the size of the preceding  destroyers to match the increase in size of foreign destroyers. The French Navy issued a general specification that required oil-fired boilers, steam turbine propulsion and a uniform armament that allowed individual shipyards the freedom to design their ships as they saw fit.

Their crews numbered 80–83 men.

The destroyers were powered by two or three steam turbines of four different models, each driving one propeller shaft using steam provided by four water-tube boilers of four different types.

The primary armament of the Bouclier-class ships consisted of two  Modèle 1893 guns in single mounts, one each fore and aft of the superstructure, and four  Modèle 1902 guns distributed amidships. They were also fitted with two twin mounts for  torpedo tubes amidships.

Ships

Citations

Bibliography

 
 
 

 
Destroyer classes
Destroyers of the French Navy
 
Ship classes of the French Navy